All Star Weekend is a major professional wrestling event produced by Pro Wrestling Guerrilla (PWG). It is a two-night event which is held during the weekend on Saturday and Sunday.

Dates, venues and main events

Results

All Star Weekend 1

Background
On March 24, 2005, PWG announced that the two-night All Star Weekend event would take place on April 1 and April 2.

Storylines
A four-way dance was scheduled to take place between AJ Styles, Christopher Daniels, El Generico and Kevin Steen at the All Star Weekend, to determine the #1 contender for the PWG Championship, but it was pushed back to The Ernest P. Worrell Memorial, with the winner scheduled to face Super Dragon for the title later in the main event. Tony Stradlin was originally supposed to be Dragon's challenger for the title but Stradlin signed a developmental contract with WWE, thus forcing him to leave PWG. Steen would win the four-way and unsuccessfully challenge Dragon for the title later in the night. Later, it was announced that Dragon would defend the PWG Championship against Generico and Steen in a three-way dance on the first night of All Star Weekend.

At All Nude Revue, Arrogance (Chris Bosh and Scott Lost) interfered in Frankie Kazarian's match against Tony Stradlin, thus costing Kazarian the match. Later that night, Arrogance retained the PWG Tag Team Championship against The Aerial Express (Quicksilver and Scorpio Sky). At The Ernest P. Worrell Memorial, Kazarian teamed with Lost's former X Foundation teammate Joey Ryan to challenge Arrogance for the Tag Team Championship, but lost the match after Kazarian prevented Ryan from using a steel chair in the match. Ryan turned on Kazarian after the match by attacking him and forming an alliance with Bosh and Lost, thus joining Arrogance. He berated the fans for cheering him over Lost, which would lead to the abandoning of Lost and Ryan's previous alliance X-Foundation in the first place. It was later announced that Kazarian would team with Aerial Express to take on Arrogance in a six-man tag team match on the first night of All Star Weekend.

In other major matches on the first night of All Star Weekend, Christopher Daniels would defend the TNA X Division Championship against Alex Shelley, James Gibson would make his PWG debut against American Dragon and AJ Styles would face Samoa Joe to determine the #1 contender for the PWG Championship, with the winner getting a title shot on night two.
Night One
The first night of All Star Weekend kicked off with an eight-man tag team match, in which Los Luchas (Phoenix Star and Zokre) and S.B.S. (Disco Machine and Excalibur) took on Hook Bomberry, Ronin, Top Gun Talwar and the debuting Davey Richards. Richards delivered a shooting star press to Excalibur for the win.

Next, Chris Hero took on Chris Sabin. Hero targeted Sabin's arm while Sabin tried to deliver a Cradle Shock to Hero and Hero applied a Hangman's Clutch II on Sabin to make him submit for the win.

Next, Jonny Storm took on Petey Williams. Storm blocked a Canadian Destroyer attempt by Williams and delivered a hurricanrana to Williams for the win.

Next, The Havana Pitbulls (Ricky Reyes and Rocky Romero) took on Kendo Kashin and Puma. Romero pinned Puma with a roll-up after dropkicking him into the corner.

Next, James Gibson made his PWG debut against American Dragon. Dragon countered a Gibson Driver attempt by Gibson into a roll-up but Gibson countered it into his own roll-up and pinned Dragon for the win.

Next, Arrogance (Chris Bosh, Joey Ryan and Scott Lost) took on Frankie Kazarian and The Aerial Express (Quicksilver and Scorpio Sky) in a six-man tag team match. Bosh accidentally hit Lost in the ring, allowing Kazarian to deliver Wave of the Futures to both men for the win.

Next, Christopher Daniels defended the TNA X Division Championship against Alex Shelley. Daniels pinned Shelley with a roll-up to retain the title. Daniels issued an open challenge for the X Division Championship after the match for night two, which Chris Hero answered and Daniels accepted Hero's challenge.

Next, AJ Styles took on Samoa Joe to determine the #1 contender for the PWG Championship on the second night. Styles countered a muscle buster by Joe into a Styles Clash for the win.

It was followed by the main event, in which Super Dragon defended the PWG Championship against El Generico and Kevin Steen in a three-way match. Dragon delivered a Psycho Driver to Generico to retain the title.

Night Two
The night two began with a four-way elimination match between Davey Richards, Puma, Ricky Reyes and Ronin. Richards scored the first elimination by pinning Ronin after Reyes delivered a clothesline to Ronin. Next, Puma applied a crossface on Richards after Richards missed a shooting star press. Puma made him submit for the elimination. Reyes delivered a neckbreaker and a brainbuster to Puma for the win.

Next, Gunning For Hookers took on S.B.S. Excalibur avoided an enzuigiri by Bomberry and delivered a German suplex and a double underhook powerbomb to Bomberry for the win.

Next, Petey Williams took on Joey Ryan. PWG commissioner SoCal Val ejected Ryan's Arrogance teammates from the ringside due to interfering in the match. Williams countered an armbar by Ryan and delivered a Canadian Destroyer to Ryan for the win.

Next, El Generico and Los Luchas took on Human Tornado and The Aerial Express. Zokre delivered a big boot to Quicksilver, allowing Generico to hit a brainbuster for the win.

Next, Christopher Daniels defended the TNA X Division Championship against Chris Hero. Hero injured his leg after missing a double stomp on Daniels, allowing Daniels to deliver an Angel's Wings to Hero to retain the title.

Next, Jonny Storm took on Kevin Steen. Steen crotched Storm on the top rope and delivered a package piledriver to Storm for the win.

Next, Chris Bosh and Scott Lost defended the PWG Tag Team Championship against Chris Sabin and Frankie Kazarian. It was Kazarian's last match in PWG due to signing a contract with WWE. Joey Ryan interfered in the match until Petey Williams showed up to prevent Ryan from interfering. Lost knocked Sabin with a leg lariat and sat on top of Kazarian's victory roll attempt to win the match and retain the titles.

It was followed by the main event, in which Super Dragon defended the PWG Championship against AJ Styles. Styles delivered a discus clothesline to Dragon to win the title.

Aftermath
Frankie Kazarian would return to PWG for one night at the 2nd Annual PWG Bicentennial Birthday Extravaganza, where he wrestled AJ Styles to a match for the PWG Championship, which ended in a draw. Kazarian would then compete in WWE for a month, before making his full-time return to PWG at Smells Like Steen Spirit.

The rivalry between Aerial Express and Arrogance continued as Aerial Express defeated Los Luchas to become the #1 contenders for the Tag Team Championship at Guitarmageddon. Aerial Express earned another opportunity against Arrogance for the titles in a masks versus title match at 2nd Annual PWG Bicentennial Birthday Extravaganza, where Aerial Express defeated Arrogance to win the titles.

All Star Weekend 2

Background
It was announced that the two-night event All Star Weekend 2: Electric Boogaloo, would be held at the Hollywood-Los Feliz Jewish Community Centre in Los Angeles, California on November 18 and November 19, 2005.

Storylines
At 2nd Annual PWG Bicentennial Birthday Extravaganza, Arrogance (Chris Bosh and Scott Lost) attacked The Aerial Express (Quicksilver and Scorpio Sky) after Aerial Express defeated Arrogance in a masks versus title match to win the PWG Tag Team Championship. Arrogance brutally attacked Sky and removed his mask thus violating the pre-match stipulation. As a result, Sky was injured and the titles were vacated. Arrogance would also begin feuding with PWG management due to their attacks on referees and disobedience of PWG commissioners SoCal Val and Dino Winwood's orders and Winwood would often get involved in physical altercations with Joey Ryan. Sky returned from his injury at Battle of Los Angeles and attacked Lost after Lost attacked the referee due to losing to Christopher Daniels in the opening round of the Battle of Los Angeles tournament. At After School Special, Lost defeated Sky by knocking him out with the brass knuckles. Also at the event, Ryan challenged Winwood to a match. At Straight To DVD, Winwood refused to wrestle Ryan but vowed to take care of Arrogance's antics. Later that night, Lost and Ryan attacked Sky after Sky defeated Christopher Daniels in a match. Winwood fired Lost and Ryan from PWG and gave Sky, the option to choose any match which he wanted. Sky convinced Winwood to rehire Arrogance and said he wanted Aerial Express and Winwood to take on Arrogance at All Star Weekend 2. Winwood rehired Arrogance and made the match official. A rematch from After School Special between Lost and Sky was also made official for the second night of All Star Weekend.

Title matches were announced for both nights of All Star Weekend; on the first night, Kevin Steen would defend the PWG Championship against Samoa Joe and the team of Davey Richards and Super Dragon would defend the PWG Tag Team Championship against Gunning For Hookers (Hook Bomberry and Top Gun Talwar); on the second night, Steen would defend the title against Chris Bosh if he retained on the first night and Richards and Dragon would defend the Tag Team Championship against Disco Machine and Excalibur if they retained on the first night.
Night One
The event kicked off with a tag team match, in which Rocky Romero and TJ Perkins took on S.B.S. (Disco Machine and Excalibur). Perkins initially made Excalibur tap out to a single legged Boston crab while the referee was distracted as Perkins sent Machine out to the ringside. Perkins proceeded to deliver a frog splash to Excalibur but the referee counted him out for staying on top rope for too long.

Next, Chris Sabin took on Petey Williams. Williams reversed a crucifix attempt by Sabin by using the ropes for leverage and pinned Sabin for the win.

Next, Christopher Daniels took on Frankie Kazarian. Kazarian rolled through a diving crossbody attempt by Daniels to pin him for the win.

In the next match, Davey Richards and Super Dragon were scheduled to defend the PWG Tag Team Championship against Gunning For Hookers (Hook Bomberry and Top Gun Talwar) but Gunning For Hookers were suspended for failing their drug tests. As a result, they were replaced by B-Boy and Ronin as Richards and Dragon's opponents in a non-title match. Richards delivered a shooting star press to Ronin for the win.

Next, Jack Evans took on El Generico. Evans delivered a 630° senton to Generico for the win.

Next, American Dragon took on Jimmy Yang. Yang delivered a Yang Time to Dragon for the win.

It was followed by the penultimate match, a six-man tag team match, in which Arrogance (Chris Bosh, Joey Ryan and Scott Lost) took on Dino Winwood and The Aerial Express (Quicksilver and Scorpio Sky). Winwood delivered a Duff Drop to Ryan with assistance from Sky for the win.

Next was the main event in which Kevin Steen defended the PWG Championship against Samoa Joe. Steen countered a Samoan drop with a crucifix and pinned Joe to retain the title.

Night Two
The night two kicked off with a tag team match, in which Human Tornado and TJ Perkins took on Alex Koslov and Ronin. Perkins applied a crossface on Koslov but was not legal, so the legally tagged Tornado applied a chinlock on Koslov to make him submit for the win.

Next, Jack Evans took on Joey Ryan. Ryan delivered a Northern Lights suplex to Evans and pinned him by putting his feet on the ropes for leverage.

Next, Scorpio Sky took on Scott Lost. Lost applied a Sharpshooter on Sky after hitting him with a steel chair. Sky was unable to get out of the hold for so long, so Dino Winwood threw a towel in the ring on Sky's behalf and the referee awarded the win to Lost.

Next, Super Dragon and Davey Richards defended the PWG Tag Team Championship against Disco Machine and Excalibur. Machine and Excalibur's New SBS teammate Kevin Steen interfered in the match on the team's behalf but Dragon managed to deliver a Supernatural Driver to Excalibur to retain the titles. Steen attacked Dragon after the match by hitting him with a package piledriver on a chair and hit Richards in the leg with that chair.

Next, Jimmy Yang took on Rocky Romero. Yang delivered a Yang Time to Romero for the win.

Next, B-Boy took on El Generico. B-Boy hit a shining wizard and a Delikado to Generico for the win.

Next, Chris Sabin and Frankie Kazarian took on Petey Williams and Hardkore Kidd. Sabin knocked Kidd out of the ring with a suicide dive, allowing Kazarian to deliver a Flux Capacitor to Williams from the top rope for the win.

It was followed by the main event, in which Kevin Steen defended the PWG Championship against Chris Bosh. Scott Lost and Joey Ryan interfered in the match on Bosh's behalf but Ryan turned on Bosh by delivering a That 70's Kick. Steen delivered a package piledriver to Bosh from the top rope to retain the title.

Aftermath
Joey Ryan was announced as Kevin Steen's next challenger for the PWG Championship at Chanukah Chaos (The C's Are Silent). At the event, Chris Bosh avenged the betrayal from Ryan by hitting the latter with a chair. However, Steen's rival Super Dragon interfered in the match by hitting two Psycho Drivers to Steen and Ryan pinned Steen to win the title. At Cruisin For A Bruisin, Bosh defeated Scott Lost to earn a title shot against Ryan and began a feud with Ryan. Bosh unsuccessfully challenged Ryan for the title on various occasions throughout the year. Arrogance reunited with Ryan after Ryan helped them in defeating Davey Richards and Super Dragon to win the PWG Tag Team Championship at Enchantment Under The Sea, so the three formed a new faction called The Dynasty with Scorpio Sky.

The feud between Scorpio Sky and Scott Lost continued as the two competed in an "I Quit" match at Chanukah Chaos (The C's Are Silent), which Sky won.

Super Dragon and Davey Richards continued their feud with New SBS as the two teams had a rematch for the PWG Tag Team Championship at Chanukah Chaos (The C's Are Silent). The match ended in a no contest after Kevin Steen attacked Dragon, leading to a Guerrilla Warfare between the two at Astonishing X-Mas, which Dragon won.

All Star Weekend 3

Background
It was announced that All Star Weekend 3: Crazymania would be held at the Hollywood-Los Feliz Jewish Community Centre in Los Angeles, California, taking place across two nights on April 8 and April 9, 2006.
Storylines
At European Vacation: England, Arrogance (Chris Bosh and Scott Lost) failed to win the PWG World Tag Team Championship from Super Dragon and Davey Richards. Dragon insulted them after the match by slapping them and refusing to shake hands with them. It led to Bosh creating "A Treatise On Those Jerks, Joey Ryan & Super Dragon". He read a few lines of the treatise in which he insulted Dragon and the PWG World Champion Joey Ryan at Hollywood Globetrotters. It would lead to Ryan interfering in Bosh's match and attacking his opponent, causing Bosh to lose by disqualification. Ryan and Dragon then attacked Bosh after the match and brawled with each other afterwards. As a result, the PWG Commissioner Dino Winwood announced that Ryan would defend the World Championship against Bosh and Dragon in a Three Way Dance on the first night of All Star Weekend 3. Winwood also announced a surprise opponent for Ryan on the second night, with the World Championship on the line if Ryan was able to retain the title on the first night, otherwise, it would remain a non-title match.

At Beyond The Thunderdome, B-Boy defeated Kevin Steen to become the #1 contender for the World Championship. Steen complained that he lost because of Joey Ryan's assault on him earlier in the night. Later that night, Ryan cheated to defeat Chris Sabin to retain the World Championship. All of Ryan's challengers complained that he cheated in his matches to retain the title, forcing Dino Winwood to announce an eight-man tournament to determine Ryan's #1 contender for the title. He announced that the first four matches of the tournament would take place on the first night of All Star Weekend, while the tournament final, a Four Way match would take place on the second night.

At Hollywood Globetrotters, Cape Fear (El Generico and Quicksilver) defeated Arrogance via disqualification in a Suck My Cock match to determine the #1 contenders for the World Tag Team Championship, after Joey Ryan attacked Generico to get Chris Bosh disqualified as part of Ryan's feud with Bosh. It led to a rematch between Cape Fear and Arrogance at Beyond The Thunderdome, which Cape Fear won to become the #1 contenders for the World Tag Team Championship. It was announced that Cape Fear would challenge Super Dragon and Davey Richards for the tag team titles on the second night of All Star Weekend, and would be facing Los Luchas (Phoenix Star and Zokre) on the first night.

Night One
The first night of All Star Weekend kicked off with a tag team match pitting Bino Gambino and Top Gun Talwar defeated Alex Koslov and Ronin. Gambino delivered a double underhook slam to Koslov for the win.

Next, M-Dogg 20 took on TJ Perkins. M-Dogg hit a big boot and a shooting star press to Perkins for the win.

The next match was scheduled to be a tag team match between The Kings of Wrestling (Chris Hero and Claudio Castagnoli) and The Briscoe Brothers (Jay and Mark). However, Briscoes were unable to attend the event and were replaced by Disco Machine and Nemesis. Kings of Wrestling delivered a Hero's Welcome Kings of Wrestling Edition to Machine for the win.

It was followed by a tournament to determine the #1 contender for the PWG World Championship, with the first match taking place between B-Boy and Excalibur. B-Boy delivered a fireman's carry into a knee strike to Excalibur for the win.

In the next tournament match, Kevin Steen took on Matt Sydal. Sydal tried to counter a package piledriver attempt by Steen into a hurricanrana but Steen managed to roll through and deliver a package piledriver to Steen for the win.

Next, Chris Sabin took on Scorpio Sky. Sabin delivered a Cradle Shock to Sky for the win.

It was followed by the last match in the first round of the #1 contender's tournament between Frankie Kazarian and Jimmy Yang. Scorpio Sky interfered in the match and distracted Kazarian, allowing Yang to deliver a hurricanrana from the top rope. Yang followed it by attempting to hit a Yang Time but Kazarian avoided it and delivered a Wave of the Future to Yang for the win.

Next was the penultimate match, in which Cape Fear (El Generico and Quicksilver) took on Los Luchas (Phoenix Star and Zokre). Star hit a handstand kick to Quicksilver but Generico made the save by hitting a running big boot, a half and half suplex and a second running big boot, allowing Quicksilver to deliver a Silver Bullet to Star for the win.

Next was a three-way dance in the main event, in which Joey Ryan defended the PWG World Championship against Chris Bosh and Super Dragon. Dragon knocked out Bosh with a forearm smash. Ryan then delivered a powerbomb to Dragon and tossed him out of the ring. Ryan went out of the ring to follow Dragon but Dragon raked him in the eye, removed the protective padding from the floor and delivered a Psycho Driver to Ryan on the exposed floor. Dragon rolled Bosh into the ring and Ryan delivered a That 70's Kick to Dragon outside the ring and pinned Bosh to retain the title.

Night Two
The second night of All Star Weekend 3 kicked off with a tag team match, pitting Bino Gambino and Top Gun Talwar against Disco Machine and Excalibur. Excalibur delivered a heart punch and a Tiger Driver '98 to Talwar for the win.

Next, Ronin took on Phoenix Star. Ronin countered a headscissors takedown attempt by Star into a Death Valley driver for the win.

Next, a Four Way match occurred between B-Boy, Chris Sabin, Frankie Kazarian and Kevin Steen to determine the #1 contender for the PWG World Championship. Kazarian almost won the match by delivering a kneeling back-to-belly piledriver to Steen and covered him for the pinfall until Scorpio Sky interfered in the match and pulled the referee out of the ring. As a result, Kazarian brawled with Sky. The distraction allowed B-Boy to deliver a fireman's carry into a knee strike to Sabin for the win.

Next, Roderick Strong took on Matt Sydal. Sydal delivered a spike DDT and a shooting star press to Strong for the win.

Next, Joey Ryan was scheduled to defend the PWG World Championship against a mystery opponent of PWG Commissioner Dino Winwood's choosing. Winwood revealed Ryan's mystery challenger to be Necro Butcher and ordered it as a falls count anywhere match due to Ryan cheating in his previous matches to retain the title. Ryan pinned Necro with a roll-up by putting his feet on the ropes for leverage to retain the title.

Next, Chris Hero took on Scorpio Sky. Hero was distracted when he brought Sky's valet Jade Chung into the ring and began spanking her. It allowed Sky to roll-up Hero by grabbing his tights for leverage and pin him for the win. Frankie Kazarian attacked Sky after the match and tried to deliver a Wave To The Future but Sky avoided the move and retreated to the backstage.

Later, a Three Way Dance took place between Claudio Castagnoli, Scott Lost and TJ Perkins. Castagnoli knocked out Perkins with a Ricola Bomb but got a near-fall as Lost broke up the pinfall. Lost delivered a Lost Cause to Castagnoli and then applied Sharpshooters on both men for the win.

It was followed by the penultimate match between M-Dogg 20 and Jimmy Yang. M-Dogg 20 hit a backbreaker and a corkscrew moonsault but Taimak distracted the referee, allowing Yang to roll-up M-Dogg 20 and pin him by putting his feet on the ropes for leverage.

Next was the main event, in which Davey Richards and Super Dragon defended the PWG World Tag Team Championship against Cape Fear. Generico set up Dragon on the top rope but Dragon delivered a Psycho Driver to Generico from the second rope to retain the titles.

Aftermath
Frankie Kazarian and Scorpio Sky got involved in a lengthy feud as the two competed in opposing teams in a tag team match at (Please Don't Call It) The O.C.. Kazarian teamed with B-Boy while Sky teamed with Joey Ryan. Kazarian and B-Boy won the match after Kazarian pinned Ryan. After the match, Kazarian and B-Boy were attacked by Ryan and Sky and Sky cut off Kazarian's ponytail. Due to pinning Ryan, Kazarian received a World Championship match at Fear of a Black Planet, which he lost due to Sky. Kazarian and Sky wrestled in various matches throughout the year, which culminated in a Loser Leaves PWG match at Based on a True Story. Kazarian won the match.

B-Boy received his World Championship opportunity against Joey Ryan in a Battledome match at Threemendous. Ryan retained the title.

All Star Weekend IV

All Star Weekend V

All Star Weekend 6

All Star Weekend 7

All Star Weekend 8

All Star Weekend 9

All Star Weekend 10

All Star Weekend 11

All Star Weekend 12

All Star Weekend 13

All Star Weekend 14

References

External links
Pro Wrestling Guerrilla official website

Professional wrestling in Los Angeles
Recurring events established in 2005
Pro Wrestling Guerrilla events
Professional wrestling in California